Luca Demattè (born 27 May 1990) is an Italian pair skater. He competed with Carolina Gillespie from 2010 to 2012. They announced the end of their partnership in April 2012. In 2013, Demattè skated a few months with Kristina Bustamante, before teaming up with Giulia Foresti.

Programs 
(with Gillespie)

Competitive highlights

With Foresti

With Gillespie

Singles career

References

External links 

 
 
 Luca Dematte (singles career) at Tracings
 Luca Dematte at sport-folio.net

Italian male pair skaters
1990 births
Living people
People from Cavalese
Sportspeople from Trentino